The 2008 Qatar Open, known as the 2008 Qatar ExxonMobil Open, for sponsorship reasons, was a tennis tournament played on outdoor hard courts. It was the 16th edition of the Qatar ExxonMobil Open, and was part of the International Series of the 2008 ATP Tour. It took place at the Khalifa International Tennis Complex in Doha, Qatar, from 31 December 2007 through 5 January 2008.

The men's singles field was led by ATP No. 4, US Open semifinalist and Moscow champion Nikolay Davydenko, Metz titlist Tommy Robredo, and St. Petersburg winner and 2007 Doha runner-up Andy Murray. Among other top seeds competing were Doha defending champion Ivan Ljubičić, Stockholm winner Ivo Karlović, Philipp Kohlschreiber, Igor Andreev and Dmitry Tursunov. Third-seeded Andy Murray won the singles title.

Finals

Singles

 Andy Murray defeated  Stanislas Wawrinka, 6–4, 4–6, 6–2

Doubles

 Philipp Kohlschreiber /  David Škoch defeated  Jeff Coetzee /  Wesley Moodie, 6–4, 4–6, [11–9]

External links
Official website
Singles draw
Doubles draw
Qualifying Singles draw